Herman Baer (born of Jewish parents in Herxheim, Germany, Jan. 29, 1830; died Charleston, South Carolina, Jan. 2, 1901) was a German-American author.

He emigrated to America when a lad of seventeen, and settled in Charleston, where he obtained employment as compositor and proof-reader in the office of the Southern Christian Advocate in 1848, in which year, too, he joined the Methodist Church. Baer taught German, French, and general topics in private families, and in 1852 became a teacher in the preparatory department of Wofford College (Methodist), in Spartanburg, S. C., from which institution he himself graduated in 1858. In 1861 he took the degree of M. D. from the Charleston Medical College, and served as surgeon through the Civil War, on the close of which he engaged in business as a wholesale druggist in Charleston.

Throughout his life Baer never lost his taste for literature, and he was a frequent contributor to church papers. Although a foreigner, he early acquired such a mastery of English as to be considered in his neighborhood an authority on English style. He married three times. In 1888 the Methodist Church Publishing House produced a book by Baer, entitled "Jewish Ceremonials."

Sources

1830 births
1901 deaths
American religious writers
Wofford College alumni
Medical University of South Carolina alumni
German emigrants to the United States
Converts to Methodism from Judaism